Emma Luart (14 August 1892, Brussels – 26 August 1968, Brussels) was a Belgian operatic soprano. A graduate of the Brussels Conservatory, she made her official stage début at The Hague in 1914. She was committed to La Monnaie in Brussels from 1918–1922 where she excelled in lyric soprano roles like Louise, Mélisande, and Manon. She spent the remainder of her career as a member of the Opéra-Comique in Paris. Her career was disrupted by the outbreak of World War II, and she was not heard on the stage again after this point.

References

1892 births
1968 deaths
Belgian operatic sopranos
Musicians from Brussels
20th-century Belgian women opera singers